Estadio Maracaná is a football stadium in Panama City, Panama. It was inaugurated in April 2014 and has a capacity of 5,500. It is the home stadium of Club Deportivo Plaza Amador. It was named after the legendary Maracanã Stadium in Rio de Janeiro, Brazil. It will be used to host matches during the 2020 FIFA U-20 Women's World Cup with the country and Costa Rica.

References

Football venues in Panama City
Sports venues in Panama City